As-Safa, also known as Tulul al-Safa, Arabic for Al-Safa hills, is a hilly region which lies in southern Syria, north-east of Jabal al-Druze volcanic plateau. It consists of a basaltic lava field of volcanic origin, covering an area of 220 square kilometres, and contains at least 38 cinder cones. This volcanic field lies within the northern part of the massive alkaline Harrat Ash Shamah volcanic field that extends from southern Syria, through eastern Jordan to Saudi Arabia. The region is extremely scarce in water.

Volcanic activities 
The field contains numerous vents which have been active during the Holocene Epoch (12,000 years ago). A boiling lava lake was observed in the Es Safa volcanic area in the middle of the 19th century (see Erta Ale in Ethiopia and Puʻu ʻŌʻō in Hawaii for reference).

Demography
The region was frequently used by the Druze through history as a refuge in the years of war. The whole region currently lies within As-Suwayda Governorate, as the governorate's borders run along the region's boundaries. Only roaming Bedouins visit it occasionally, in addition to some archaeologists. Safaitic inscriptions were first discovered in this area in 1857, and were named after the region.

Syrian civil war
In the Syrian civil war, al-Safa became the last pocket of ISIL in the As-Suwayda Governorate and the Rif-Damasiq Governorate. It was surrounded by the Syrian Army in the As-Suwayda offensive. The area was captured on 17 November 2018.

List of volcanic cones in Es Safa 

 Tell el Aqzass (Tell el Aqzass) 889 m.
 Tell ed Ders (Tell ed Ders) 878 m.
 Jabal Rghēli (Jabal Rgheli) 874 m.
 Tell Darayir Šimāli (Tell Darayer Shimali) 844 m.
 Tell Um Ħwār (Tell Um Hwar) 818 m.
 Tell Um el Janbrīs (Tell Um el Janbris) 808 m.
 Tell Darayir Qebli (Tell Darayir Qebli) 803 m.
 Tell ‘Ali (Tell Ali) 770 m.
 Tell al Khēl (Tell el Kheil) 765 m.
 Tell Eş Şafa (Tell Es Safa) 739m.
 Tell Ţarrān (Tell Tarran) 731 m.
 Jabal Sīs (Jabal Sees) 692 m.
 Tell Zqēţa (Tell Zqeita) 670 m.
 Jabal el Jarīn (Jabal el Jareen) 657 m.
 Jabal Abū Ghanem (Jabal Abu Ghanem) 632 m.

References

External links
 
 Photos of Es-Safa volcano in Panoramio

Mountains of Syria
Volcanic fields
Es Safa